Muangchang United Football Club (Thai สโมสรฟุตบอลเมืองช้าง ยูไนเต็ด), is a Thai football club based in Surin, Thailand. The club is currently playing in the 2017 Thaileague 5 tournament North Eastern Region.

Record

References

 http://www.kruball.com/2016/05/blog-post_29.html
 Muangchang United news
 https://www.siamsports888.com/%E0%B8%97%E0%B8%B5%E0%B9%88%E0%B8%A3%E0%B8%B0%E0%B8%A5%E0%B8%B6%E0%B8%81-%E0%B9%84%E0%B8%97%E0%B8%A2%E0%B8%AE%E0%B8%AD%E0%B8%99%E0%B8%94%E0%B9%89%E0%B8%B2-%E0%B8%A1%E0%B8%AD%E0%B8%9A%E0%B9%80
 https://www.youtube.com/watch?v=spNfJ52wKeA
 https://www.youtube.com/watch?v=lzVlCokZCf8

Association football clubs established in 2016
Football clubs in Thailand
Sport in Tak province
2016 establishments in Thailand